Cada Dia Mejor is the sixth studio album by Mexican group Los Caminantes, released in 1985.

Track listing

References

[ Billboard page]

1985 albums
Los Caminantes albums
Spanish-language albums